Glycoconjugates are the classification family for carbohydrates – referred to as glycans – which are covalently linked with chemical species such as proteins, peptides, lipids, and other compounds. Glycoconjugates are formed in processes termed glycosylation.

Glycoconjugates are very important compounds in biology and consist of many different categories such as glycoproteins, glycopeptides, peptidoglycans, glycolipids, glycosides, and lipopolysaccharides.  They are involved in cell–cell interactions, including cell–cell recognition; in cell–matrix interactions; in detoxification processes.

Generally, the carbohydrate part(s) play an integral role in the function of a glycoconjugate; prominent examples of this are neural cell adhesion molecule (NCAM) and blood proteins where fine details in the carbohydrate structure determine cell binding (or not) or lifetime in circulation.

Although the important molecular species DNA, RNA, ATP, cAMP, cGMP, NADH, NADPH, and coenzyme A all contain a carbohydrate part, generally they are not considered as glycoconjugates.

Glycocojugates is covalent linking of carbohydrates antigens to protein scaffolds with goal of achieving a long term immunological response in body. Immunization with glycoconjugates successfully induced long term immune memory against carbohydrates antigens. Glycoconjugate vaccines was introduced since the 1990s have yielded effective results against influenza and meningococcus.

In 2021 glycoRNAs were observed for the first time.

References

Carbohydrates
Glycobiology